Björn Borg was the defending champion, but did not play that year. Borg would eventually retire from professional tennis in January 1983, after playing only one tournament in the entire season at Monte Carlo.

Ramesh Krishnan won the title by defeating Sandy Mayer 5–7, 6–3, 6–3, 7–6 in the final.

Seeds

Draw

Finals

Top half

Bottom half

References

External links
 Official results archive (ATP)
 Official results archive (ITF)

Stuttgart Singles
Singles 1982